Bradley is a civil parish in the Borough of Stafford, Staffordshire, England. It contains eight listed buildings that are recorded in the National Heritage List for England. Of these, one is listed at Grade I, the highest of the three grades, and the others are at Grade II, the lowest grade.  The parish contains the village of Bradley and the surrounding countryside.  The listed buildings consist of a church, houses, farmhouses, a cottage and a public house, the oldest of which are timber framed or have timber framed cores.


Key

Buildings

References

Citations

Sources

Lists of listed buildings in Staffordshire